St. Xavier's High School, Nerul (estd. 1985) is one of the first schools established in Nerul, Navi Mumbai, India. It is recognized by the Government of Maharashtra and affiliated to the Maharashtra State Board of Secondary and Higher Secondary Education, i.e., S.S.C. and H.S.C.(Science).

The school provides education in English,and Semi English mediums of instruction.

In response to heavy demand for colleges in the city of Navi Mumbai, St. Xavier's High School started its Junior College of Science in 2000. Now the school is known as St. Xavier's High School & Junior College of Science.

This school was the first in Navi Mumbai to start a National Cadet Corps and National Social Services.

Notable alumni
Suma Shirur (née Dixit), Indian national rifle shooting champion and Arjuna awardee. She belonged to the SSC batch of 1989, and was headgirl of afternoon section in 1986.

Education in Navi Mumbai
Educational institutions established in 1985
High schools and secondary schools in Mumbai
1985 establishments in Maharashtra